Francis McCormack (8 April 1833 – 14 November 1909) was an Irish Catholic bishop of the 19th and 20th century.

Early life and family
Francis Joseph McCormack was born in Ballintubber in 1833. He studied for the priesthood in Maynooth College. His nephew, Captain Patrick McCormack, was one of the Cairo Gang assassinated on Bloody Sunday (1920). Dr McCormack was also a cousin of the founder of the Land League, Michael Davitt.

Priest 

McCormack was ordained a priest in 1862.

Bishop
McCormack was consecrated a bishop by John McEvilly, Archbishop of Tuam. He was  Bishop of Achonry 1871 to 1887. In 1879 a minor famine saw 300 people beg food from the bishop at Christmas. He wrote a letter to the Land League, contrasting the vast sums spent on the Anglo-Zulu War and Second Anglo-Afghan War with the minimal amount the government spent on famine relief. He also condemned "assisted emigration," whereby landlords paid the fare to get rid of unwanted tenants.

In 1887 McCormack was translated to the Diocese of Galway and Kilmacduagh where he served until he retired due to ill health in 1908. He died in 1909. He is buried in Galway Cathedral crypt, his papers are stored in the Diocesan archive.

References

1833 births
1909 deaths
People from County Mayo
Roman Catholic bishops of Achonry
Roman Catholic bishops of Galway, Kilmacduagh and Kilfenora
Alumni of St Patrick's College, Maynooth